Koceila Julien Mammeri (born 23 February 1999) is a badminton player from Algeria who trained at the Oullins club in France. In the junior event, he was the third place at the Portugal International tournament in the boys' doubles event. He won gold medals at the 2017, 2019, 2020, 2021 and 2022 African Championships for men's doubles with his partner Youcef Sabri Medel, and in 2018 and 2019 for mixed doubles with Linda Mazri, and also in 2021 and 2022 for mixed doubles with Tanina Mammeri. Together with Mazri, he claimed the gold medal at the 2019 African Games.

Achievements

African Games 
Mixed doubles

African Championships 
Men's doubles

Mixed doubles

Mediterranean Games 
Men's doubles

BWF International Challenge/Series (6 titles, 2 runners-up) 
Men's doubles

Mixed doubles

  BWF International Challenge tournament
  BWF International Series tournament
  BWF Future Series tournament

References

External links 
 

1999 births
Living people
Sportspeople from Chambéry
French expatriate sportspeople in Algeria
21st-century Algerian people
Algerian male badminton players
Competitors at the 2019 African Games
African Games gold medalists for Algeria
African Games silver medalists for Algeria
African Games medalists in badminton
Competitors at the 2022 Mediterranean Games
Mediterranean Games gold medalists for Algeria
Mediterranean Games medalists in badminton